Ryūzu Falls (龍頭滝, -taki, lit. "Dragon's Head Waterfall") is a waterfall located upstream from the Yugawa River which makes its way into Lake Yunoko and Lake Chūzenji.  It is located near Nikkō in Tochigi Prefecture, Japan.

Ryūzu can be translated as 'Dragon's Head', and is so named because its twin falls are said to resemble a dragon's head.

Waterfalls of Japan
Tourist attractions in Tochigi Prefecture
Landforms of Tochigi Prefecture